Raeda Saadeh (born 1977) is a Palestinian artist.
She won the 2000 "The Young Artist of the Year Award," by the Qattan Foundation.

Life
She was born in Umm al-Fahm, a Palestinian-populated city in the North of Israel. She received her BFA and MFA from the Bezalel Academy of Arts and Design, Jerusalem. She studied at the School of Visual Arts.

Her work is in the collection of the Victoria and Albert Museum, Fonds régional d'art contemporain, and Le Magasin.

She lives and works in Jerusalem.

Exhibitions
2007 "Vacuum" screened in Sharjah Biennial 8
2005 "Sharjah Art Museum" ART COLOGNE, Germany
2005 "Mediterranean Encounters," Castello Ruffo, Scilla-Italy
2004 "Mediterraneans," Macro Museo D'Arte Contemporanea, Rome, Italy
2004 Bezalel Academy of Arts and Design Final Show, Tel Aviv
2004 Unscene, University of Greenwich, London, UK

References

External links
Contemporarypractices.net

1977 births
Living people
People from Umm al-Fahm
Israeli Arab artists
Palestinian women artists
Arab citizens of Israel
Palestinian contemporary artists
School of Visual Arts